Muhammad Anwaarul Haq (born 1 January 1957) is a Pakistani jurist and 47th Chief Justice of Lahore High Court.

Career
Haque was appointed as justice of Lahore High Court on 19 February 2010. He became chief justice of the same court on 22 October 2018.

References

	

1957 births
Living people
Judges of the Lahore High Court
Pakistani judges